The Cowichan Symphony Society was founded in 1955 and is based in Duncan, British Columbia.

The Society promotes classical music through concerts and music education programs within the Cowichan Valley. The Cowichan Symphony Society Board works to compile a series of classical music concerts from a variety of sources for the Society. Concerts are selected, priced, and scheduled by the Board for their year-long season, which members may subscribe to on a year-to-year basis, or they may purchase tickets for individual shows.

The Cowichan Symphony Society often partners with the Victoria Symphony, conducted by Tania Miller, to offer concerts at the Cowichan Theatre, within the Cowichan Community Centre. The Society has also collaborated with the Vancouver Island Symphony in the past.

References

External links
Victoria Symphony 
Cowichan Symphony Society 

Musical groups established in 1955
Symphony orchestras
1955 establishments in British Columbia
Duncan, British Columbia